Drunkard's Walk is a science fiction novel by American writer Frederik Pohl. It was originally published in paperback by Ballantine Books in 1960 and early in 1961 by Gnome Press in a hardback edition of 3,000 copies.  The novel was originally serialized in the magazine Galaxy Science Fiction.

Plot

The novel tells the story of a math professor who struggles against urges to commit suicide. His life seemed so successful. He was a well-liked college-on-TV lecturer who offered the public a way to improve their meager living standards in the crowded future world of 2200. He has a lovely young wife, which would seem to be a protective factor. Doctors have ruled out depression, and they cannot figure out his problem. Yet in a suicidal attempt he tries to hurl himself from a high balcony. During one TV lecture he cuts his neck on live broadcast, and he takes an overdose of pills. In fact, a mysterious foe is trying to cause the professor to die, and this villain plans to increase the death toll into the millions.

References

External links 
 
 Drunkard's Walk parts 1 and 2 at the Internet Archive

1960 American novels
1960 science fiction novels
Novels by Frederik Pohl
American science fiction novels
Works originally published in Galaxy Science Fiction
Novels first published in serial form
Ballantine Books books